Combining may refer to:

 Combine harvester use in agriculture
 Combining capacity, in chemistry
 Combining character, in digital typography
 Combining form, in linguistics
 Combining grapheme joiner, Unicode character that has no visible glyph
 Combining Cyrillic Millions, as above but for one million
 Combining like terms, in algebra
 Combining low line, underline, in typography
 Combining macron below, Unicode combining diacritical mark
 Combining weight, system of chemical weights created by Ernst Gottfried Fischer
 Custom combining, in agriculture harvesting
 Diversity combining, in telecommunications
 Food combining, in nutrition
 Maximal-ratio combining, in telecommunications
 Protein combining, in nutrition
 Write-combining, in computing

See also
 
 
 Combine (disambiguation)
 Mixing (disambiguation)